The men's 400 metres event at the 1977 Summer Universiade was held at the Vasil Levski National Stadium in Sofia on 19, 20 and 21 August.

Medalists

Results

Heats

Semifinals

Final

References

Athletics at the 1977 Summer Universiade
1977